Francesco Borriello (born 25 July 2005) is an Italian professional footballer who plays for  club Parma.

Club career 
Born in Catania, Sicily, Francesco Borriello came trough the youth ranks of the local Calcio Catania.

Borriello made his professional debut for Catania on the 21 August 2021, starting in the 1-0 away Coppa C win against Vibonese.

In January 2022 he was transferred to Parma Calcio in Serie B, first joining the youth sector of the club, playing close to the likes of Italian idol Gianluigi Buffon.

International career 
Borriello was first selected in the Italian under-17 team in 2021 whilst still at Catania, thus being the only one of his teammates playing in a Serie C club.

He was part of the Italy team playing the under-17 Euro 2022.

References

External links

2005 births
Living people
italian footballers
Italy youth international footballers
Association football goalkeepers
Sportspeople from Catania
Catania S.S.D. players
Parma Calcio 1913 players
Serie C players